The Slow Natives (1965) is a Miles Franklin Award-winning novel by Australian author Thea Astley, the second of her record number of four wins. It also won the 1965 Moomba Award.

Plot summary

Set in sub-tropical Queensland, the novel examines the relationships between suburban Brisbanites including a priest, nuns and a couple and their teenage son.

Style and themes
The novel represents a departure for Astley from her earlier novels in that rather than focusing on one or two particular characters, she moves "freely among a group, switching attention omnisciently from one to another. Almost all the characters suffer from some form of spiritual aridity; in Astley's vision, there often seems nothing between repression, and empty or even corrupt sexuality".

Astley's characters in this novel often only realise their failings after disaster has beset them. The father, for example, only realises after his teenage son has lost his leg in a "joy-riding accident", that he has "failed to give his son 'the sort of discipline ... [he] wanted more than anything in the world'."

Notes

References
Middlemiss.org
Taylor, Cheryl and Perkins, Elizabeth (2007) "Warm words: North Queensland writing" in Patrick Buckridge and Elizabeth McKay (ed.) By the Book: A Literary History of Queensland, St Lucia, University of Queensland Press

1965 Australian novels
Miles Franklin Award-winning works
Novels by Thea Astley
Novels set in Brisbane
Angus & Robertson books